Yvonne Monlaur (born Yvonne-Thérèse-Marie-Camille Bédat de Monlaur; 15 December 1939 – 18 April 2017) was a French film actress of the late 1950s and 1960s best known for her roles in the Hammer horror films.

Early years
Monlaur was born in Paris, France. Her father, Pierre Bédat de Monlaur (fr), was a poet, descended from the French comital family of d'Escoubès de Monlaur; her mother was a ballet dancer. As a child, she studied ballet, and as a teenager she was a fashion model.

Career
Monlaur starred in the 1958 Italian film Three Strangers in Rome, which was among Claudia Cardinale's earliest films, and in 1960 in the horror film Circus of Horrors alongside prominent actors in British film such as Anton Diffring and Donald Pleasence. In 1960, she also starred in the Hammer horror film The Brides of Dracula alongside other noted British actors of the day Peter Cushing and Freda Jackson and in The Terror of the Tongs (1961) with Christopher Lee.

Monlaur screentested for the role of Domino Derval in the 1965 James Bond film Thunderball. The role eventually went to another French actress, Claudine Auger.

Later years
After working on a number of German and Italian films, Monlaur left the industry and returned to Paris. She attended a few film conventions, which included tributes to her time working on the Hammer films.

Death
Monlaur died in Paris, France, on 18 April 2017, aged 77, survived by her only son Alexis.

Selected filmography

References

External links
 

1939 births
2017 deaths
French people of Russian descent
French film actresses
20th-century French actresses
People from Pau, Pyrénées-Atlantiques